Allen Eager (January 10, 1927 – April 13, 2003) was an American jazz tenor and alto saxophonist who also competed in auto racing and took part in LSD experiments.

Early life
Allen Eager was born in New York City on January 10, 1927. He grew up in the Bronx. According to Denise McCluggage, Eager could read aged 3, and learned to drive at the age of 9 with the help of his mother, after she caught him driving a garbage truck near the hotels that his parents owned in the Catskill Mountains. He took clarinet lessons with David Weber of the New York Philharmonic at the age of 13.

Early career in jazz
Eager briefly played with Woody Herman at the age of 15. At the same age, he took heroin for the first time. Aged 16, he played in the band of Bobby Sherwood, then went on to play with Sonny Dunham, Shorty Sherock, and Hal McIntyre. Eager was then with Herman again in 1943–44, Tommy Dorsey, and Johnny Bothwell in 1945. After World War II he became a regular on the scene around 52nd Street in New York; he led his own ensemble there from 1945–47. His recording debut as leader was for Savoy Records in February 1946. His band consisted of Ed Finckel (piano), Bob Carter (bass), and Max Roach (drums); two of the tracks formed Eager's first release as leader. His playing style on tenor saxophone was, along with contemporary saxophonists Zoot Sims, Stan Getz, Al Cohn and others, strongly influenced by Lester Young; Eager appears to have been the first of this group to follow Young's light sound on tenor, and was the best known and most respected of them at that point. Young's assessment was that "Allen Eager is [...] the best of the grey boys [white players]". At the same time as following Young in sound, Eager also adopted the musical forms pioneered in bebop. He also adopted the drug dependency of a lot of the bebop players in the 1940s.

Unusually for a white saxophonist of the time, Eager was a member of several bands led by black musicians. These included Coleman Hawkins, with whom he recorded in 1946, and beboppers Fats Navarro and Charlie Parker in 1947. Eager recorded with trumpeter Red Rodney for Keynote Records in 1947. Also in the late 1940s, Eager recorded with saxophonist Stan Getz. Eager also played with Tadd Dameron at the Royal Roost in New York in 1948. Some of these concerts were broadcast on the radio. Critic Ira Gitler commented positively on the concerts: "Whatever he played swung with a happy, light-footed quality and pure-toned beauty".

From around this period, some rich women "sought out jazz musicians for a connection to a way of life otherwise denied them". One of these, heiress Peggy Mellon Hitchcock, became associated with Eager, and the pair often appeared in newspaper gossip columns. One instance was much later, when a court case that highlighted the fact that Eager had borrowed $48,500 from her attracted publicity.

Eager played with Gerry Mulligan in 1951, with Terry Gibbs in 1952, and shortly after with Buddy Rich. He then briefly abandoned music and became a ski and horse riding instructor. Eager's drug addiction could clearly be linked to his music career, as Ira Gitler noted: "when he was skiing or horseback riding and completely away from music, he was healthy, but every time he returned to his tenor, the demon that pursued Bird [Charlie Parker] found him again". From 1953 to 1955 he again led his own ensemble as a saxophonist. He frequently played with Howard McGhee, including in Chicago in early 1956. He lived in Paris from 1956 to 1957, and continued playing there. Back in the U.S. in 1957, Eager recorded The Gerry Mulligan Songbook under Mulligan's leadership, which was his last recording for 25 years. After this, he essentially retired from jazz. Eager mentioned the death of Charlie Parker (in 1955) and his own problems with drug addiction as reasons for his withdrawal from the scene. Eager appears in Jack Kerouac's 1958 book The Subterraneans as the character Roger Beloit.

Later life
Eager went on to pursue other activities such as skiing, competitive auto racing, and LSD experiments with Timothy Leary. He became a ski patroller when the Hunter Mountain ski resort opened, and was there introduced to racing car driver Denise McCluggage. After some instruction from McCluggage, the pair raced in the 12 Hours of Sebring in 1961 in a Ferrari 250 GT, finishing tenth overall, first in GT and first in class. Encouraged by their success, they flew the car to Europe and took part in the 1000 km Nürburgring; Eager crashed. They entered an O.S.C.A. for the 1962 Sebring race, in which Eager and Ken Miles collided, and for a race at the Bridgehampton Race Circuit, at which McCluggage crashed. In July 1963 a serious crash left Eager with broken bones.

Eager occasionally dabbled in music again, playing alto saxophone with Charles Mingus at the rival Newport Jazz Festival in 1960. Ira Gitler noted that "The years away from his horn had made him rusty; moreover, the old fire and fine timing were heard only in fleeting moments". In the late 1960s he settled in Florida with his family. He played with Frank Zappa in the 1970s. In 1982 Eager made a comeback with an album for Uptown Records, entitled Renaissance. The pianist for this quartet session, Hod O'Brien, remembers Eager making a very slow start: "it was as though he had never blown a sax before [... but] slowly and surely, the lines got clearer and longer. It was as though he learned to play again in the space of half an hour". O'Brien described Eager as "a temperamental guy" who, during a first-night concert around the time of their recording, fired the rhythm section that had been hired to play with him, because he wanted to change from playing straight-ahead jazz to free. Eager toured with Dizzy Gillespie in 1983. Eager played in England in May of the same year, playing jazz standards in his familiar 1940s style that included "terse, sidelong phrases". Some other tours in Europe were with Chet Baker.

He died from liver cancer on April 13, 2003, in Daytona Beach, Florida. He was survived by his ex-wife, Nancy, two daughters, a son, and two granddaughters.

Discography
This section contains only albums, some of which were made up in part of tracks previously or simultaneously released as singles. Tracks and albums have often been reissued and repackaged; where possible, only an early release is listed.

An asterisk (*) indicates that the date is that of release.

As leader

As sideman

Compilations that include previously unreleased recordings

References

External links

Biography and descriptive partial discography by Len Dobbin
[ Allen Eager] at AllMusic

1927 births
2003 deaths
American jazz saxophonists
American male saxophonists
Musicians from New York City
People from the Bronx
20th-century American saxophonists
Jazz tenor saxophonists
Jazz alto saxophonists
Bebop saxophonists
Jazz musicians from New York (state)
20th-century American male musicians
American male jazz musicians
Uptown Records (jazz) artists